La Chorrera is a city and municipality in central Panama, located about 30 km south-west of Panama City. Is the capital of the province of Panamá Oeste and one of the larger cities in the country and is fond of the phrase "La Bella, Enamoradora y Querendona, La Gran Chorrera", reportedly as a tribute to its beautiful women, kind people, and happy nightlife.

La Chorrera is renowned for its international fair and famous as being the home of Bollo and Chicheme. It's the home of San Francisco F.C., Mariano Rivera (five-time World Series champion with the New York Yankees), Vicente Mosquera (former World Boxing Champion), and José Luis Garcés.

Geography and climate

La Chorrera has a warm tropical climate with heavy seasonal rains in the months of May to November, leading to extensive grasslands that favor the raising of cattle and to a lesser extent pigs.

The fertile lands yield good crops of pineapple, rice, coffee, oranges, cassava, beans and sugar cane. Approximately 2% of the country's lumber comes from this district.

Location
La Chorrera is located on the Panamerican Highway between the districts of Capira and Arraiján, and is about 7 kilometers from the Pacific coast.

History
The origin of the name of La Chorrera is not known with certainty, but it is assumed that it is due to the large number of waterfalls that exist, which include El Chorro de La Chorrera, El Chorro Trinidad, El Chorro de Caño Quebrada and others.

Villages
 

Barrio Colón

References
 http://www.presidencia.gob.pa

Populated places in Panamá Oeste Province